"Yes, Indeed!" is a 1941 swing song in the spiritual style written by Sy Oliver.

A recording by the Tommy Dorsey Orchestra charted in Billboard in the United States in the summer of 1941, peaking at #4.

Notable recordings and performances 

Bing Crosby and Connie Boswell (1941)
Tommy Dorsey and His Orchestra with Jo Stafford and Sy Oliver, the composer (1941)
Teddy Powell with Ruth Gaylor (1941)
 The Charioteers (1941)
 Bobby Sherwood (1955)
Dinah Shore on Dinah, Yes Indeed! (1959)
Ray Charles (1962)
Peggy Lee and The Righteous Brothers sang the song on The Ed Sullivan Show (1965)

References 

1941 songs
Songs with music by Sy Oliver